Bobot may refer to:
 Bobot language, a language of Indonesia
 Bobot, Trenčín District, a village in Slovakia
 Bobot, Albania, a village in Albania
 Edgar Mortiz (born 1954), also known as Bobot, Filipino actor and singer

See also 
 Bobot Adrenaline, American rock band